Leopold Rosenfeld  (21 July 1849 – 19 July 1909) was a Danish composer and singing teacher. He was also a music critic at the newspapers Danneborg, Musikbladet and Tidsskrift for Musik og Teater.

In 1889, he was titled professor. One of his pupils was the opera singer Helge Nissen.

He was buried at the Jewish Western Cemetery in Copenhagen.

Compositions
 "Aa farvel og vær velsignet (for voice and piano)
 "Asali" (for voice and piano)
 "Bjergpigen" (for solo, choir and orchestra)
 "En nytårslåt" (for voice and piano)
 "Folkevise" (for voice and piano)
 "Ingalill" (for voice and piano)
 "Klokkeklang" (for voice and piano)
 "Opus 3: Fem characteerstykker" (for piano)
 "Opus 17: 5 Clavierstücke" (for piano)
 "Opus 24: DIGTE af Alfred Ipsen og Ernst v. d. Recke"
 "Opus 25: Henrik og Else" (for solo, choir and orchestra)
 "Opus 48: Saïna. Østerlandske stemninger" (for piano)

See also
List of Danish composers

References

This article was initially translated from the Danish Wikipedia.

External links
 
Streaming audio
Aa farvel og vær velsignet        
 Ingalill

Danish composers
Male composers
1849 births
1909 deaths
Danish Jews
19th-century male musicians